Kirsty Muir (born 5 May 2004) is a Scottish freestyle skier representing Great Britain who competed in the big air and slopestyle events at the 2022 Winter Olympics. She came second in the big air event at the 2020 Winter Youth Olympics, and third in the big air and slopestyle events at the 2023 X Games.

Career
Muir started skiing at Aberdeen Snowsports Centre at the age of three. She began with alpine skiing, before switching to freestyle skiing. At the 2018 British Championships, she won the big air, halfpipe and slopestyle events. In 2019, she won the first Europa Cup Slopestyle event in which she competed, and won a medal in another Europa Cup event that season. She came second in the 2019 British Championships big air event. At the 2019 FIS Junior World Freestyle Skiing Championships, Muir came second and third in two of the events.

At the 2020 Winter Youth Olympics, Muir came second in the big air event, and fourth in the slopestyle event. She was Team GB's flagbearer at the closing ceremony of the Games. Muir competed in the FIS Freestyle Ski and Snowboarding World Championships 2021, where she placed sixth in women's ski slopestyle. She came second in the slopestyle event at the 2020–21 FIS Freestyle Ski World Cup competition in Aspen, Colorado, US. It was her fourth senior event.

Muir competed in the big air and slopestyle events at the 2022 Winter Olympics. She was the youngest Briton at the Games. She finished seventh in the qualification round of the big air event, and fifth overall in the final. After the first run in the final, Muir had been in third position, and she was the youngest finalist in the event. Muir came sixth in the slopestyle qualifying round, and eighth in the final, one place ahead of fellow Briton Katie Summerhayes.

At the 2023 Winter X Games, Muir came third in the big air and slopestyle events.

Honours
In 2022, Muir was awarded the Scottish Youth Award for Excellence in Mountain Culture.

Personal life
Muir is from Kingswells, Aberdeen, Scotland, and attends  Bucksburn Academy.

References

External links

2004 births
Living people
British female freestyle skiers
Freestyle skiers at the 2020 Winter Youth Olympics
Freestyle skiers at the 2022 Winter Olympics
Sportspeople from Aberdeen
Olympic freestyle skiers of Great Britain